Avigdor Victor Levontin (17 June 1922 – 5 January 2016) was an Israeli lawyer.

Biography
Avigodr Levontin earned a Doctor of Juridical Science (Ph. D.) degree from Harvard University.

Academic and legal career
He was the editor in chief of The Israel Law Review when it was established in January 1966.  He was a member of the National Academy of Sciences, and an expert in international law. He served as Dean of the Faculty of Law at The Hebrew University of Jerusalem, and was described by Life magazine as a "prominent" professor.   He also served on Israel's delegation at the United Nations.

Published works

Books
Choice of law and conflict of laws, Avigdor Victor Levontin, Brill Archive, 1976
The myth of international security : a juridical and critical analysis, Avigdor Victor Levontin, Magnes Press, 1957
Mishpat benleʼumi peraṭi u-vendati, Avigdor Levontin, Mifʻal ha-shikhpul, Histadrut ha-sṭudenṭim shel ha-Universiṭah ha-ʻIvrit, 1957

Articles
"Jewish and Democratic – Personal Reflections", Avigdor Levontin, 19 Tel Aviv University Law Review 521, 1994–95

References

Israeli Jews
Israeli diplomats
Harvard University alumni
International law scholars
People from Tel Aviv
Academic staff of the Hebrew University of Jerusalem
Jews in Mandatory Palestine
1922 births
Academic journal editors
2016 deaths
Conflict of laws scholars